Hazara in Europe are people of Hazara descent living in Europe today hundreds of thousand are residents in Europe. The vast majority form part of what is sometimes called the "Hazara diaspora".

History 
The Hazaras have encountered intense persecution for centuries.
In the late 1800s, much of the Hazarajat, their mountainous homeland in central Afghanistan, was seized by Pashtun and other tribes.
More recently, the Soviet invasion in 1979 prompted another mass exodus.
A further wave fled the country as the largely ethnic Pashtun Taliban took control of the Hazarajat in 1998, massacring thousands of Hazaras.
The first Hazara came to Europe were in 1800s and they were from the Indian British army infantry regiment 106th Hazara Pioneers, 4th Hazara Pioneers and 108th Hazara Pioneers they were fought in WW1 on side of allies in France) but more recent Hazaras came to Europe after NATO Forces left Afghanistan.

See also 
 Hazara diaspora
 Hazara Australians
 Hazara Indonesians

References 

Hazara diaspora